Guilherme de Souza (born 18 January 1990), commonly known as Choco, is a Brazilian footballer. He normally plays in the right-back position, but can also play on the right side of midfield.

Career

Ludogorets Razgrad
Choco went through the youth academy of Santos Futebol Clube. On 7 January 2011, he moved from Santos to Bulgarian side Ludogorets Razgrad, signing a three and a half-year contract and becoming the team's first foreign signing of the Domuschiev era.

Choco scored his first goal for Ludogorets on 15 October 2011, netting the second goal in a 4–1 home win over Minyor Pernik. He was primarily a starter during the 2011–12 season, being a key part of Petev's team that won its first top division title, but made only very sporadic appearances over the course of the 2012–13 championship. He continued to feature only on rare occasions during the 2013–14 (though he did play a part in the 2013–14 UEFA Europa League group stage, appearing in three of their victories) and 2014–15 campaigns (not being registered for the 2014–15 UEFA Champions League group stage). Choco left the team by mutual consent at the end of November 2014. He stated that Ludogorets will always remain in his heart.

Following his release from Ludogorets, Choco attracted interest from the Kazakhstan Premier League, but eventually he didn't complete any move there.

APOEL
On 27 May 2015, Choco signed a two-year contract, with the option of a further season with APOEL from Cyprus. His contract with APOEL was terminated in December 2015, leaving the team after only seven months and without managing to appear in any official match.

Sampaio Corrêa
On 23 December 2015, he moved back to his country and signed a contract with the Campeonato Brasileiro Série B club Sampaio Corrêa.

Lokomotiv Plovdiv
On 19 December 2016, Choco signed with Bulgarian First League club Lokomotiv Plovdiv. In May 2017, his contract was terminated by mutual consent.

Sūduva Marijampolė
On 5 September 2017, Choco signed with A Lyga club Sūduva Marijampolė.

Return to Ludogorets
In July 2020 Choco returned to Ludogorets, but this time he signed with their double – Ludogorets Razgrad II, to help the young players.

FK Kauno Žalgiris
In January 2021 he returned back to Lithuania and became a member of FK Kauno Žalgiris.

Career statistics

International career
On 26 October 2011, Choco received a Bulgarian passport and potentially became able to play for Bulgaria.

Honours

Club
 Ludogorets
 Bulgarian A Group: 2011–12, 2012–13, 2013–14
 Bulgarian Cup: 2011–12, 2013–14
 Bulgarian Supercup: 2012, 2014

Sūduva
 A Lyga: 2017

References

External links
 APOEL official profile
 

1990 births
Living people
Brazilian footballers
Brazilian expatriate footballers
Association football fullbacks
Sport Club Corinthians Paulista players
Santos FC players
Red Bull Brasil players
PFC Ludogorets Razgrad players
APOEL FC players
Sampaio Corrêa Futebol Clube players
Associação Olímpica de Itabaiana players
FC Montana players
PFC Lokomotiv Plovdiv players
FK Sūduva Marijampolė players
Esporte Clube Juventude players
Ituano FC players
FC Lokomotiv 1929 Sofia players
PFC Ludogorets Razgrad II players
FK Riteriai players
First Professional Football League (Bulgaria) players
Second Professional Football League (Bulgaria) players
Cypriot First Division players
A Lyga players
Brazilian emigrants to Bulgaria
Naturalised citizens of Bulgaria
Expatriate footballers in Bulgaria
Expatriate footballers in Cyprus
Expatriate footballers in Lithuania
Brazilian expatriate sportspeople in Cyprus
Brazilian expatriate sportspeople in Lithuania
Footballers from São Paulo (state)